The 2012 USA Sevens was the ninth edition of the USA Sevens tournament and the fifth tournament of the 2011–12 IRB Sevens World Series. The host stadium was the Sam Boyd Stadium.

Samoa won the title by defeating New Zealand 26–19 in the final.

Format
The teams were divided into pools of four teams, who played a round-robin within the pool. Points were awarded in each pool on a different schedule from most rugby tournaments—3 for a win, 2 for a draw, 1 for a loss.
The top two teams in each pool advanced to the Cup competition. The four quarterfinal losers dropped into the bracket for the Plate. The Bowl was contested by the third- and fourth-place finishers in each pool, with the losers in the Bowl quarterfinals dropping into the bracket for the Shield.

Teams
16 teams participated:

Pool stage
The draw was made on February 4.

Pool A

Pool B

Pool C

Pool D

Knockout stage

Shield

Bowl

Plate

Cup

Television
The 2012 USA Sevens earned strong ratings on TV in the US, with higher ratings than several basketball and hockey games on TV that weekend.  The TV ratings for selected sports events on network and cable TV that weekend are below:
 0.7    USA Sevens Rugby
 0.4    NHL: Detroit v. Philadelphia
 0.3    NCAA: Alabama v. LSU
 0.1    NCAA: Wichita v. Creighton
 0.1    NCAA: Xavier v. Temple
 0.1    NCAA: Utah St. v. New Mexico St.
 0.1    NCAA: Ark - Little Rock v. Middle Tenn. St.

References

External links

2012
2012 in American rugby union
2011–12 IRB Sevens World Series
Sports competitions in Las Vegas
2012 in sports in Nevada